The  was an infantry division of the Imperial Japanese Army. It was formed 10 July 1945 in several towns along Jilin - Shenyang railroad as a triangular division. It was a part of the 8 simultaneously created divisions batch comprising 134th,  135th, 136th, 137th, 138th, 139th, 148th and 149th divisions. The nucleus for the formation was the small parts detached from the 1st mobile brigade.

Action
30 July 1945, the 138th division was assigned to the 30th army. It was nearly unarmed until the end of July 1945, besides the small arms brought by the men transferred from the other units. Even the rifles were issued only shortly before the surrender of Japan. The division was coherent enough to have the first task (the construction of fortifications) issued only by 6 August 1945. Also, the divisional commander did not arrive until 10 August 1945.

At the beginning of Soviet invasion of Manchuria 9 August 1945, the 138th division was ordered to Fushun. The division was immediately reassigned to the 3rd area army. The division arrived to Fushun 12 August 1945. It was disarmed by Red Army 19 August 1945 in the aftermath of the surrender of Japan.

See also
 List of Japanese Infantry Divisions

Notes and references
This article incorporates material from Japanese Wikipedia page 第138師団 (日本軍), accessed 8 July 2016
 Madej, W. Victor, Japanese Armed Forces Order of Battle, 1937–1945 [2 vols], Allentown, PA: 1981.

Japanese World War II divisions
Infantry divisions of Japan
Military units and formations established in 1945
Military units and formations disestablished in 1945
1945 establishments in Japan
1945 disestablishments in Japan